Lake View is the name of several places:

Australia
Lake View, South Australia

United States
Lake View, Alabama
Lake View, Arkansas
Lake View, Chicago, Illinois
Lake View, Indiana
Lake View, Iowa
Lake View Plantation, Maine
Lake View Township, Becker County, Minnesota
Lake View, Mississippi
Lake View, South Carolina
Lake View, Texas

See also
Lakeview (disambiguation)
Lake View Cemetery (disambiguation)